Arne Geijer (born 7 May 1910, in Söderala, Söderhamn Municipality, Hälsingland, died 27 January 1979 in Bromma, Stockholm) was a Swedish trade union organizer.

Geijer left school when he was thirteen and began working in agriculture.  He later completed an apprenticeship as a toolmaker, and joined the Swedish Metalworkers' Union.  At the age of 28 he began working full-time for the union as its director of education, and in 1945 he won election as its general secretary, also taking up a position of the council of the International Metalworkers' Federation.

In 1955, Geijer was elected to the upper house of the Riksdag, representing the Swedish Social Democratic Party.  The following year, he won election as chair of the Swedish Trade Union Confederation, and from 1957 he held these two posts alongside being president of the International Confederation of Free Trade Unions.  In this role, he was known for his backing for the International Solidarity Fund.  He was replaced as president in 1965, but remained chair of the Swedish Trade Union Confederation until 1973.  In retirement, he served as chair of the Swedish National Pensioners' Organisation from 1977 until 1979.

References

Swedish trade unionists
1910 births
1979 deaths
Arne